is a Japanese word for "combatant", "soldier", or "warrior".

Senshi may also refer to:

 Senshi (wrestler) (born 1979), American professional wrestler Brandon Silvestry, who now goes by Low Ki
 Sailor Senshi, a fictional team of ten magical girls in the Sailor Moon franchise
 A skilled gunner, as used in the Japanese anime and manga series Grenadier

See also 
 Senshi-Con, an anime convention
 Senshi Sōsho, a compilation series of Japanese military history 
 "Dennō Senshi Porygon", a Pokémon episode that was noted for having caused seizures in over 630 viewers
 Sentai (戦隊), a Japanese military unit